Xerophyllum is the name of two genera:

Xerophyllum (plant) a genus of Melanthiaceae
Xerophyllum (grasshopper) a genus of grasshopper